The Lewis & Clark Bicycle Trail is a bicycle touring route created by Adventure Cycling Association to commemorate the bicentennial of the 1804-1806 Corps of Discovery Expedition. The route follows the path of Meriwether Lewis and William Clark as they explored the Louisiana Purchase and the Pacific Northwest.

Route
The Lewis & Clark Bicycle Trail starts in Hartford, Illinois, close to where the Lewis and Clark Expedition began in St. Charles, Missouri. Since the expedition traveled primarily by boat, the bicycle route follows their path along the Missouri and Columbia rivers as much as possible.

The route has 4,589 mapped miles and includes a number of optional spurs, detours, and even Clark’s eastbound return path after the expedition had split into two parties at Traveler’s Rest in Lolo, Montana. The more historically accurate route, though, is 3,143 miles.

Terrain 
The main route varies from paved roads, bike paths, unpaved rail trails, and gravel roads. The route’s elevation varies from flat plains to hilly sections in the mountains.

Logistics 
Rough, gravel roads along the route may require off-road tires. A water filter may be necessary as many of the campsites are primitive, and the route can be ridden from May through September.

Sponsors
The Lewis & Clark Bicycle Trail was recognized by the National Council of the Lewis & Clark Bicentennial as part of the nationwide celebration.

Adventure Cycling received funding from REI for the Lewis & Clark Bicycle Trail.

States on the trail 
Missouri
Kansas
Nebraska
Iowa
South Dakota
North Dakota
Montana
Idaho
Washington
Oregon

See also
Bicycle touring
Adventure Cycling Route Network

References

External links

National Council of the Lewis & Clark Centennial

Bike paths in Oregon
Bike paths in Kansas
Bike paths in Nebraska
Bike paths in Iowa
Bike paths in South Dakota
Bike paths in North Dakota
Bike paths in Montana
Bike paths in Idaho
Bike paths in Washington (state)
Bike paths in Missouri
Historic trails and roads in the United States